Domestic Blitz is an Australian lifestyle and DIY television series that originally aired on the Nine Network from 18 May 2008 to 18 April 2010. The series is based on the format of Backyard Blitz, which had previously aired on the Nine Network, and generally occupied its same former timeslot of Sunday 6:30 to 7:30 pm. Rather than rewarding nominated candidates with solely a garden makeover though, Domestic Blitz introduced the element of house renovations as well. The series exhibits similarities to the American television series Extreme Makeover: Home Edition and the Angry Anderson A Current Affair "challenges" (1994–1998) in that the candidates either come from a disadvantaged background, or include someone with a terminal illness.

The series was hosted by Scott Cam and Shelley Craft, with Cam having previously been the resident builder on Backyard Blitz, and featured a design team of Chontelle Samios (interior) and Joel Hurrey (landscape), as well as Richard Reid as the family guide. There were also occasional celebrity guests, notably singers Michael Bublé, Pink and wrestler Dave Batista.

Although the regular series ended in 2010, a television special featuring the contestants from The Block 2012 aired on 8 July 2012 on the Nine Network. Cam was joined in hosting the special by former Backyard Blitz host and counterpart Jamie Durie. A second television special featuring the contestants of The Block: Sky High aired on 4 August 2013.

Series overview

Reception

Ratings 
The ratings for Domestic Blitz's first series were deemed very strong, with the show winning its 6:30pm Sunday and Monday 7:30pm timeslot every week since the show made its debut. The show's highest ratings to date were recorded on 13 July with 1.68 million people tuning in, making the show the second highest rating show of that night.

Series 1 (2008)

Series 2 (2009)

 * Melbourne and Sydney only

Series 3 (2009)

Series 4 (2010)

The Block to the Rescue (Specials)

See also 
 Backyard Blitz
 List of Australian television series

References

External links 
 

Australian non-fiction television series
Nine Network original programming
2008 Australian television series debuts
2010s Australian television series
Home renovation television series
English-language television shows